This article lists some of the events that took place in the Netherlands in 2003.

Incumbents
Monarch: Beatrix
Prime Minister: Jan Peter Balkenende

Events
 January 1 - The Ravenstein municipality ceases to exist and is amalgamated into the Oss municipality.
 January 22 - Dutch general election, 2003
 February 10 - Mayor Haaksman of the Delfzijl resigns amidst allegations of affairs, crises and scandals in his municipality. Former minister Annemarie Jorritsma-Lebbink is placed as interim mayor shortly here after . 
 March 14 - Opening of the Westerscheldetunnel
 June 30 - Announced that Prince Friso is to marry Mabel Wisse Smit. 
 August 7 - Arcen is struck by a heatwave and reached a temperature of 37,8 °C. 
 October 10 - The Dutch Government revoke their approval of the marriage between Prince Friso and Mabel Wisse Smit. According to Prime Minister Jan Peter Balkenende the bride did not fully disclose her past and contact with top criminal Klaas Bruinsma.
 December 12 - The Dutch Reformed Church, Reformed Churches in the Netherlands and the Evangelical Lutheran Church in the Kingdom of the Netherlands decide to merge.

Sport
 2002–03 Eredivisie
 2002–03 Eerste Divisie
 2002–03 KNVB Cup
 2003 Johan Cruijff Schaal
 William Kipsang wins the Amsterdam Marathon

Births

 7 December – Catharina-Amalia, Princess of Orange

Deaths
 January 28 - Mieke Pullen, runner (b. 1957)
 August 17 - Bertus Lüske, criminal, assassinated in Watergraafsmeer
 October 5 - Addict Anja Joos, kicked to dead by security people of a supermarket in Amsterdam after suspicions that she stole a small can of lemonade. The receipt was later found in her clothing.
 October 24 - Death of René Steegmans
 November 17 - 16-year-old Maja Bradarić, murdered.

See also
2003 in Dutch television

References

 
Netherlands
Years of the 21st century in the Netherlands
2000s in the Netherlands
Netherlands